Clarkson is an unincorporated community in Lawrence County, in the U.S. state of Missouri.

History
A post office called Clarkson was established in 1889, and remained in operation until 1903. The community was named after a postal official.

References

Unincorporated communities in Lawrence County, Missouri
Unincorporated communities in Missouri